Steven Elbert Brown (born February 12, 1957) is an American former professional baseball player who played two seasons for the California Angels of Major League Baseball (MLB).

Brown is a graduate of the University of California, Davis.he now teaches at Gray Avenue Middle School in Yuba City, California

References

External links

1957 births
Living people
American expatriate baseball players in Canada
Baseball coaches from California
Baseball players from San Francisco
California Angels players
Edmonton Trappers players
El Paso Diablos players
Idaho Falls Angels players
Indianapolis Indians players
Major League Baseball pitchers
Salinas Angels players
Salt Lake City Gulls players
Spokane Indians players
UC Davis Aggies baseball players